The Nebraska State League (NSL) was an American professional minor league baseball league with five incarnations between 1892 and 1959. The Nebraska State League formed five times: in 1892, from 1910 to 1915, from 1922 to 1923, from 1928 to 1938 and from 1956 to 1959. League teams were based in Iowa, Kansas, Nebraska and South Dakota. The 1892 league was a Class B level league, and the league was a Class D level league in all subsequent seasons.

History

Early seasons
The charter 1892 teams were the Beatrice Indians, Fremont, Grand Island Sugar Citys, Hastings, Lincoln Giants/Kearney and Plattsmouth. The league played just one season as a Class B level league before disbanding.

In 1889, a touring African-American baseball team called the "Lafayettes" was formed in Nebraska. In 1890, William Pope formed the Lincoln Giants. Pope had signed the best of the Lafayette players and the team subsequently folded. In 1892, the Lincoln Giants sought to join the Nebraska State League. Those against allowing black players in the league caused the Lincoln Giants to fold, with many of their players picked up by the other Nebraska State League teams.

The Nebraska State League in 1892 was racially integrated. Baseball Hall of Fame member Bud Fowler played for Kearney and was elected captain of the team. John W. Patterson, John Reeves, Frank Maupin, A.S. Kennedy, William Myers and F. Long played for Plattsmouth. George Taylor, played for Beatrice. The 1892 Nebraska State League was classified as a Class B level league and folded after the 1892 season.

The Nebraska State League reformed in 1910 as an eight–team Class D level league. The Columbus Discoverers, Fremont Pathfinders, Grand Island Collegians, Hastings Brickmakers, Kearney Kapitalists, Red Cloud, Seward Statesmen and Superior Brickmakers were the member franchises as the league resumed play.

In 1915, the Nebraska State League ran into financial difficulties as franchises struggled to remain solvent. Both Columbus and Kearney disbanded on June 4, 1915. After Grand Island withdrew June 28 and Norfolk disbanded June 29, the league folded on June 29, 1915. Kearney began the season 2,000 in debt and sold season tickets to eliminate the debt, but with 2,000 season tickets sold, the gameday gate money was minimal and the franchise was also affected by the city becoming "dry" and became unable to make its financial obligations to visiting teams. Kearney had logistical issuer as visiting teams were reluctant travel to Norfolk, as the train fares for the trip were expensive. Norfolk had agreed to pay extra to visiting clubs to make up the difference in train fares. Grand Island manager Harry Claire and player Crosby were given suspensions for the rest of the year due to gambling accusations and the team was also fined. The Grand Island franchise folded instead of paying the fines.

After folding following the 1915 season, the Nebraska State League reformed and played the 1922 and 1923 seasons with the Beatrice Blues, Fairbury Jeffersons, Grand Island Champions, Hastings Cubs, Lincoln Links and Norfolk Elk Horns as members of the six–team Class D level league. The league evolved into the 1924 Tri-State League.

In 1928, the Nebraska State League resumed play as an eight–team Class D level league. The Beatrice Blues, Fairbury Jeffersons, Grand Island Champs, Lincoln Links, McCook Generals, Norfolk Elks, North Platte Buffaloes and York Dukes were the 1928 league members. The league would play continually through the 1938 season.

1956 to 1959 seasons
The Nebraska State League formed for the final time in 1956. The league teams were all major league affiliates, as the Class D level eight–team league resumed play. The league members all took the monikers of their affiliate, as the Grand Island A's, Hastings Giants, Holdrege White Sox, Kearney Yankees, Lexington Red Sox, McCook Braves, North Platte Indians and Superior Senators were the 1956 franchises.

Originally 12 cities had showed interest in hosting a team in the 1956 Nebraska State League. Thie interest occurred after the eight major league teams had agreed to affiliate with the league. The Nebraska cities of Ogallala, Alma, Broken Bow and Norton, Kansas were not granted franchises.

The 1956 league schedule was designed to start on July 1st and end on Labor Day. The league structure began when representatives of the league held a meeting in Kearney, Nebraska at the Fort Kearney Hotel in early June. The 1956 schedule was created by Harold George, secretary of the league. George was formerly an executive in the Western League. Mike Hollinger, a former manager of the semi–pro Kearney Irishmen team was named president of the League. Hollinger operated a bowling alley in Kearney.

In structuring the 1956 league, revenue and expenses were divided between Major League Baseball, the individual Major League parent clubs and each of the league franchises. League franchises committed to selling at least $5,000 in tickets and 500 season tickets before the season started.  Kearney sold 760 season ticket books, McCook followed with 741. Holdrege sold 690, North Platte 673, Lexington 665, Grand Island 656, Hastings 632 and Superior 559. The league was owned by Major League Baseball. Season tickets were sold for $10.00 each. The revenue from the first 500 tickets per franchise went to the Nebraska State League ($5,000 per team).  25% of each season ticket went to the hosting team. Concessions were split evenly between the hosting team and the league. Each team city supplied a lighted home ballpark park and a groundskeeper. The official score keeper for each game was paid $2.50. Player and manager salaries and travel costs were handled by the parent major league affiliate, with Yellow Diamond and Continental Motor lines were hired as vendors to provide bus services. Players were allotted $2.25 per day for meal money. The league selected the Rawlings baseball as the official ball for the league, with the Major League affiliates providing balls. KGFW radio in Kearney paid $500.00 for radio rights to all Kearney games.

The last Nebraska State League of 1956–1959 was stable largely because its clubs were farm teams for the major leagues. Its final season has become well-known through the book A False Spring by Pat Jordan, who played in the league for McCook.

The Nebraska State League was a Class B level league in the 1892 season and afterwards was exclusively a Class D level league.

Cities Represented

 Beatrice, NE: Beatrice Indians 1892; Beatrice Milkskimmers 1913–1915; Beatrice Blues 1922–1923, 1928, 1932–1938
 Columbus, NE: Columbus (NE) Discoverers 1910–1913; Columbus Pawnees 1914–1915
 Fairbury, NE: Fairbury Shaners 1915; Fairbury Jeffersons 1922–1923; 1928–1930; Fairbury Jeffs 1936–1937
 Fremont, NE: Fremont 1892; Fremont Pathfinders 1910–1913
 Grand Island, NE: Grand Island Sugar Citys 1892; Grand Island Collegians 1910–1913; Grand Island Islanders 1914; Grand Island Champions 1915; Grand Island Champions 1922–1923, 1928; Grand Island Islanders 1929–1932; Grand Island Red Birds 1937; Grand Island Cardinals 1938; Grand Island Athletics 1956–1959
 Hastings, NE: Hastings 1892; Hastings Brickmakers 1910; Hastings Third Citys 1911–1913; Hastings Reds 1914–1915; Hastings Cubs 1922–1923; Hastings Giants 1956–1959
Holdrege, NE: Holdrege White Sox 1956–1959
 Kearney, NE: Kearney 1892; Kearney Kapitalists 1910; Kearney Buffaloes 1911; Kearney Kapitalists 1912–1914; Kearney Buffaloes 1915; Kearney Yankees 1956–1959
Lexington, NE: Lexington Red Sox 1956–1958
 Lincoln, NE: Lincoln Giants 1892; Lincoln Links 1922–1923, 1928–1935; Lincoln Red Links 1936; Lincoln Links 1938
 McCook, NE: McCook Generals 1928–1932; McCook Braves 1956–1959
 Mitchell, SD: Mitchell Kernels 1936–1937
 Norfolk, NE: Norfolk Drummers 1914–1915; Norfolk Elk Horns 1922–1923; Norfolk Elkhorns 1928–1932; Norfolk Elks 1933; Norfolk Elkhorns 1934–1935; Norfolk Elks 1936–1937; Norfolk Elkhorns 1938
 North Platte, NE: North Platte Buffaloes 1928–1932; North Platte Indians 1956–1959
 Norton, KS: Norton Jayhawks 1929–1930
Plattsmouth, NE: Plattsmouth 1892
 Red Cloud, NE: Red Cloud 1910
 Seward, NE: Seward Statesmen 1910–1913
 Sioux City, IA: Sioux City Cowboys 1938
 Sioux Falls, SD: Sioux Falls Canaries 1933–1938
 Superior, NE: Superior Brickmakers 1910–1914; Superior Senators 1956–1958
 York, NE: York Prohibitionists 1911–1915; York Dukes 1928–1931

Standings & statistics

1892
1892 Nebraska State League
League disbanded in July.

1910 to 1915
1910 Nebraska State League
Playoffs: None Scheduled

1911 Nebraska State League
Playoffs: None Scheduled

1912 Nebraska State League
A Kearney win over Hastings was reversed at the 1913 spring meeting, giving Hastings the championship.Playoffs: None Scheduled

1913 Nebraska State League
Seward (27–37) moved to Beatrice July 21.Playoffs: None Scheduled

1914 Nebraska State League
Playoffs: None Scheduled

1915 Nebraska State League
 Columbus and Kearney disbanded June 4; Grand Island and Norfolk disbanded June 28.The league folded July 18.

1922 to 1923
1922 Nebraska State League
Playoff: Fairbury 4 games, Norfolk 3.

1923 Nebraska State League
Playoff: No Playoffs Scheduled

1928 to 1938
1928 Nebraska State League
Playoff: No Playoffs Scheduled

1929 Nebraska State League
Playoff: No Playoffs Scheduled

1930 Nebraska State League
Norton suspended operations August 25; final seven games were forfeited to scheduled opponents.Playoffs: None Scheduled.

1931 Nebraska State League
Playoffs: Grand Island 4 games, North Platte 1.

1932 Nebraska State League
Playoffs: Beatrice 2 games, Lincoln 1. Finals: Beatrice 4 games, Norfolk 3.

1933 Nebraska State League
Playoffs: Beatrice 5 games, Norfolk 4.

1934 Nebraska State League
Playoffs: None Scheduled

1935 Nebraska State League
Playoffs: Norfolk 4 games, Sioux Falls 3.

1936 Nebraska State League
Lincoln and Fairbury disbanded July 16.Playoffs: Sioux Falls 3 games, Beatrice 2: Mitchell 3 games, Norfolk 1. Finals: Mitchell 4 games, Sioux Falls 2.

1937 Nebraska State League
Playoffs: None Scheduled.

1938 Nebraska State League
Playoffs: Norfolk 4 games, Sioux City 2.

1956 to 1959
1956 Nebraska State League
Playoffs: None Scheduled.

1957 Nebraska State League
Playoffs: None Scheduled.

1958 Nebraska State League
Playoffs: None Scheduled.

1959 Nebraska State League
Playoffs: None Scheduled.

Hall of Fame alumni
Fred Clarke, 1892, Hastings 
Bud Fowler, 1892, Kearney
Jim Kaat, 1957, Superior Senators 
Phil Niekro, 1959, McCook Braves 
Dazzy Vance, 1912–1913, Superior Brickmakers; 1914, Hastings Reds

Sources
 The Encyclopedia of Minor League Baseball: Second Edition.
 This article incorporates content from the "Nebraska State League" article at the Baseball-Reference.com Bullpen. The Bullpen is a wiki, and its content is available under the GNU Free Documentation License.

References

External links
 Nebraska Minor League Baseball History

Baseball in Nebraska
Defunct minor baseball leagues in the United States
Baseball leagues in Nebraska
Baseball leagues in South Dakota
Baseball leagues in Iowa
Baseball leagues in Kansas
Sports leagues established in 1892
1959 disestablishments in the United States
Sports leagues disestablished in 1959